Christel Fechner (born 25 June 1964) is a Belgian swimmer. She competed in the women's 400 metre individual medley at the 1980 Summer Olympics.

References

External links
 

1964 births
Living people
Belgian female medley swimmers
Olympic swimmers of Belgium
Swimmers at the 1980 Summer Olympics
Place of birth missing (living people)